Culmore railway station served Culmore and Coolkeeragh in  County Londonderry in Northern Ireland.

The Londonderry and Coleraine Railway opened the station on 1 October 1853.

It closed on 2 July 1973.

Routes

References

Disused railway stations in County Londonderry
Railway stations opened in 1853
Railway stations closed in 1972

Railway stations in Northern Ireland opened in 1853